Gazlıgöl is a town (belde) and municipality in the İhsaniye District, Afyonkarahisar Province, Turkey. Its population is 2,486 (2021).

References

Populated places in Afyonkarahisar Province
Towns in Turkey
İhsaniye District